Ninabamba District is one of eleven districts of the province Santa Cruz in Peru.

References